Virion is another name for a virus particle.

Virion may also refer to:

 Charles Virion (1865-1946), a noted French sculptor and ceramicist
 Pierre Virion (1899–1988), a French journalist and writer
 Virion Screen Project, a screen based digital art exhibition